Erik Vonk (born 1953) is an entrepreneur and author. Vonk is the former President and CEO of Randstad North America. He developed the concept of "FlexLife" that encourages workers to string together a self-managed, full-time career of short-term job assignments.

Career
Vonk began his career in international banking, including Chase Manhattan Bank and ABN-AMRO Bank. He was president and CEO of Randstad North America and started the North American operations from scratch in 1992.  
In 2002, Vonk became Chairman and CEO of Gevity HR, Inc.  Under Vonk's leadership, Gevity HR earned a spot on BusinessWeeks 2006 list of Hot Growth Companies.

Author

Vonk's 2001 book Don't Get a Job, Get a Life is about flexible employment and work/life balance.

References

External links
 Interview with the Wall Street Transcript

Randstad NV people
Living people
Corporate executives
Dutch male writers
Dutch businesspeople
1953 births